The 3rd Aerobic Gymnastics European Championships was held in Debrecen, Hungary, October 24–26, 2003.

Results

Medal table

References
Official results (PDF file)
Results

Aerobic Gymnastics European Championships
2003 in gymnastics
International gymnastics competitions hosted by Hungary
2001 in Hungarian sport